Free Kitten is an American alternative rock band formed by Sonic Youth's Kim Gordon and Pussy Galore's Julia Cafritz. Originally performing as Kitten, they changed their name after receiving threats of legal action by a heavy metal singer performing under the same name. Boredoms member Yoshimi P-We took up drums, and Pavement's Mark Ibold joined later on as bassist. They have released a handful of albums and singles, mainly on label Kill Rock Stars, including a remix 12-inch featuring DJ Spooky. They toured on 1993's Lollapalooza. A studio album, 2008's Inherit, on Thurston Moore's Ecstatic Peace! label, is the group's most recently available.

Discography

Studio albums

Compilation albums

EPs

Singles

References

External links

All-female bands
Alternative rock groups from New York (state)
Kill Rock Stars artists
Musical groups established in 1992
Musical groups disestablished in 1997
Musical groups reestablished in 2007
Riot grrrl bands
Sympathy for the Record Industry artists
Ecstatic Peace! artists